The Cockrell School of Engineering is one of the eighteen colleges within the University of Texas at Austin. It has more than 8,000 students enrolled in eleven undergraduate and thirteen graduate programs. The college is ranked 10th in the world according to the Academic Ranking of World Universities, 9th nationally for undergraduate programs and 6th nationally for graduate programs by U.S. News & World Report. Nine of the ten undergraduate programs and seven of the eleven graduate programs are ranked in the top ten nationally.  Annual research expenditures are over $180 million and the school has the fourth-largest number of faculty in the National Academy of Engineering.

Previously known as the College of Engineering, on July 11, 2007, the University of Texas at Austin renamed the College after 1936 graduate Ernest Cockrell Jr., whose family has over the past 30 years helped to build a $140 million endowment for the College.

Undergraduate departments
Rankings, in parentheses, taken from the 2023 edition of U.S. News & World Report.

Overall: 9th
 Petroleum Engineering (1st)
 Environmental Engineering (7th)
 Civil Engineering (5th)
 Computer Engineering (8th)
 Aerospace/Aeronautical Engineering (8th)
 Chemical Engineering (8th)
 Electrical/Electronic Engineering (11th)
 Mechanical Engineering (10th)
 Biomedical Engineering (16th)

Graduate departments
Rankings, in parentheses, taken from the 2023 edition of U.S. News & World Report.

Overall: 6th
 Petroleum Engineering (1st)
 Environmental Engineering (3rd)
 Chemical Engineering (5th)
 Civil Engineering (6th)
 Aerospace/Aeronautical Engineering (8th)
 Computer Engineering (9th)
 Electrical/Electronic Engineering (9th)
 Mechanical Engineering (10th)
 Materials Engineering (14th)
 Nuclear Engineering (17th)
 Industrial/Manufacturing/Systems Engineering (19th)
 Biomedical Engineering (22nd)

Traditions

The Ramshorn
The Ramshorn is one of the most prominent symbols associated with the College of Engineering. Its origins as such can be traced back to over a century ago, when T.U. Taylor, the first engineering faculty member and first dean of the College, began drawing the elaborate checkmark on students' work. A mark reserved for perfect papers, Taylor overheard a student remark he had received a "ramshorn" in 1905, from which the symbol took on its current interpretation and significance.

Alexander Frederick Claire
Alec's beginnings as the patron saint of the College came as the byproduct of the efforts of a group of sophomore engineers back in 1908.

Joe H. Gill and his engineering friends thoughtfully considered how to make a holiday of April Fool's Day. After an unsuccessful attempt involving tying cans around dogs' tails and releasing them to disrupt class, the group of students saw a wooden statue about five feet high while getting refreshments, which they requested to borrow. The next day, Gill presented the statue as their patron saint and traced his ancestry back to ancient times between classes. The presentation successfully broke up classes, and led to his christening as Alexander Frederick Claire, patron saint of UT engineers, exactly one year later. Alec was at the center of a friendly rivalry between law and engineering students for many years, and was subject to numerous escapades such as kidnappings and amputations. Today, what is left of the original wooden statue is safely preserved in the engineering library.

Every year, engineering groups on campus build new Alecs which are then voted on by the students. The winner is announced on April 1 during Alec's birthday party.

Notable faculty
 John B. Goodenough, recipient of 2019 Nobel Prize in Chemistry for research leading to creation of lithium-ion battery
 Hans Mark, former Secretary of the Air Force and Deputy Administrator of NASA
 Yale Patt, inventor of the WOS module, the first complex logic gate implemented on a single piece of silicon
 Alan Bovik, Primetime Emmy Award-winning engineer whose video quality tools pervade television, social media and home cinema
 Ilya Prigogine, recipient of 1977 Nobel Prize in Chemistry for his contributions to non-equilibrium thermodynamics
 Robert Metcalfe, co-inventor of Ethernet
 Willis Adcock, worked on the first atomic bomb and assisted with the invention of the silicon transistor, as well as the integrated circuit
 Edith Clarke, first woman faculty member of electrical engineering in the US and inventor of Clarke Calculator and method of symmetrical components

Research centers
The Cockrell School of Engineering has formal organized research units that coordinate and promote faculty and student research. These units provide and maintain specialized research facilities for faculty within a designated field.
 Advanced Manufacturing Center
 Center for Aeromechanics Research
 Center for Energy & Environmental Resources
 Energy Institute
 Advanced Research in Software Engineering
 Center for Mechanics of Solids, Structures & Materials
 Center for Petroleum & Geosystems Engineering
 Center for Research in Water Resources
 Center for Space Research
 Center for Transportation Research UT Austin
 Computer Engineering Research Center
 Construction Industry Institute
 Phil M. Ferguson Structural Engineering Laboratory
 Microelectronics Research Center
 Offshore Technology Research Center
 Texas Materials Institute
 Wireless Networking & Communications Group
 Applied Research Laboratories
 Institute for Computational Engineering and Sciences
 Center for Subsurface Energy and the Environment
 Center for Nanomanufacturing Systems for Mobile Computing and Mobile Energy Technologies (NASCENT)
 Center for Electromechanics
 Center for Additive Manufacturing and Design Innovation
 The Center for Predictive Engineering and Computational Sciences (PECOS)
 Center for Perceptual Systems
 Institute for Cellular and Molecular Biology

Student organizations
The Cockrell School of Engineering is home to over 80 student organizations under the supervision of the Engineering Student Life Office.  These organizations offer a wide variety of student groups that provide academic, professional development, service, and social opportunities. The majority are student chapters of national and international professional engineering organizations.  Among the organizations are:
 The Student Engineering Council (SEC) is the umbrella organization of all the engineering student organizations, with over thirty engineering organizations affiliated. The SEC is responsible for acting as the official voice of all engineering students in the school and putting on events that benefit the engineering students including the Fall Engineering EXPO, which is the 2nd largest student-run career fair in the United States.
 Omega Chi Epsilon (OXE) is the Chemical Engineering honor society. Candidates are invited each semester to undergo a pledge process which involves service events, social events, and faculty firesides. OXE's meetings feature high-profile industry partners and are open to all engineering students.
 The American Institute of Chemical Engineers (AICHE) is the primary professional student organization within the Chemical Engineering Department at the University.
 The American Society of Civil Engineers (ASCE) is the primary professional student organization within the Civil Engineering Department at the University.
 The Institute of Transportation Engineers (ITE), the Intelligent Transportation Society of America (ITS America), and the Women's Transportation Seminar (WTS) are the primary professional student organizations for transportation students at the University. 
 The American Society of Mechanical Engineers (ASME) is the primary professional student organization within the Mechanical Engineering Department at the University.
 The Institute of Electrical and Electronics Engineers (IEEE) is the primary professional student organization within the Electrical and Computer Engineering Department at the University.
Eta Kappa Nu (HKN) is the honor society of the IEEE and serves electrical engineering, computer engineering, computer science, and other IEEE fields of interest. The University's Psi Chapter of HKN was chartered in 1928 as the 22nd chapter within HKN.
 The Society of Petroleum Engineers (SPE) is the primary professional student organization within the Hildebrand Department of Petroleum and Geosystems Engineering at the University.
 The Society of Hispanic Professional Engineers (SHPE), the Society of Asian Scientists and Engineers (SASE), and the National Society of Black Engineers (NSBE) are three national professional student organizations who represent and develop minority student engineers at the University.
 The Society of Women Engineers (SWE) is a professional student organization who represents women engineers at the University.
 Engineers for a Sustainable World (ESW) is a professional student organization whose aim is to improve the sustainability at the University.
 The Business Engineering Association (BEA) is Cockrell School of Engineering's newest professional student organization. It aims to connect business and engineering students interested in working in industries where business and engineering people work together.
 Longhorn Racing (LHR) builds two Formula SAE cars each year, combustion and electric, and the Solar Vehicles Team builds a new solar-powered car every two years.

References

External links
 The University of Texas at Austin Cockrell School of Engineering

Engineering schools and colleges in the United States
Engineering universities and colleges in Texas
University of Texas at Austin schools, colleges, and departments
Educational institutions established in 1894
1894 establishments in Texas